Quinten Benjamin Frederick Rollins (born July 15, 1992) is a former American football cornerback. He played one year of college football at Miami University, after playing four years of basketball. He was drafted by the Green Bay Packers in the second round of the 2015 NFL Draft. He also previously played for the Arizona Cardinals.

Early years
Quinten Rollins was raised by his mother and his grandmother along with two younger brothers. He attended Wilmington High School in Wilmington, Ohio, where he played both basketball and football for the Hurricanes. A four-year letter winner and two-year captain on the  basketball team, and as a senior in 2009–10 he was named Division II first-team All-Ohio, averaging 19.5 points, 4.0 rebounds, 2.6 steals and 2.5 assists per game. As a junior in 2008–09. he was third-team All-Ohio, averaging 17.0 points, 5.0 rebounds, 4.0 assists and 2.0 steals.

In football, he was a three-year team captain. As a senior, Rollins was a first-team all-conference selection and Division II third-team All-Ohio. He is a member of the Wilmington High School Athletic Hall of Fame.

College career
Rollins played college basketball at Miami University from 2010 to 2014. During his career at Miami  he played in 116 games and finished second in RedHawks history with 214 career steals. He also ranked fourth at Miami in career assists (391), seventh in games started (106) and ninth in minutes played (3,448). He was a three-time Miami defensive player of the year.

Rollins joined Miami's football team in 2014. In his lone season of football, he was the MAC Defensive Player of the Year after recording 72 tackles and seven interceptions.

College football statistics

Professional career

Green Bay Packers
The Green Bay Packers selected Rollins in the second round (62nd overall) of the 2015 NFL Draft. Rollins was the ninth cornerback selected in 2015 and was the highest selection from Miami University (Ohio) since Ben Roethlisberger in 2004. He also became the Redhawks' sixth highest selection and 45th player drafted in school history.

2015
On May 12, 2015, the Green Bay Packers signed Rollins to a four-year, $3.74 million contract that also includes $1.25 million guaranteed and a signing bonus of $981,864.

He fell behind after missing the first three weeks of training camp with a hamstring injury. Upon returning from injury, he competed against first round pick and fellow rookie Damarious Randall for the third cornerback spot on the Packers' depth chart. Head coach Mike McCarthy named him the fourth cornerback behind Sam Shields, Casey Hayward, and Damarious Randall to start the regular season.

He made his professional regular season debut in the Green Bay Packers' season-opener at the Chicago Bears and made one solo tackle in their 31–23 victory. He was inactive the following week after the Packers' chose to play Demetri Goodson instead. On October 11, 2015, Rollins recorded two tackles, two pass deflections, and made his first career interception off St. Louis Rams' quarterback Nick Foles, and returned it for a 45-yard touchdown to put the Packers ahead 14–0 late in the first quarter. He recorded his second career interception with 28 seconds remaining in that game to secure the 24–10 victory for the Packers. On November 26, 2015, Rollins collected three combined tackles, one pass break up, and made his first career sack on Jay Cutler as the Packers were defeated by the Chicago Bears 17–13. The following week, Rollins earned his first career start in place of Damarious Randall who was inactive for Week 13 due to a knee injury. He recorded five combined tackles and broke up a pass in the 27–23 victory at the Detroit Lions. In Week 16, he recorded a season-high five solo tackles during a 38–8 loss at the Arizona Cardinals. Rollins finished his rookie season with 31 combined tackles (28 solo), six pass deflections, two interceptions, a sack, and a touchdown in 14 games and four starts.

The Green Bay Packers finished second in the NFC North with a 10-6 record and received a playoff berth. On January 10, 2016, Rollins played in his first playoff game and made one solo tackle and a pass breakup during the Packers' 35–18 victory at the Washington Redskins. They were eliminated from the playoffs after being defeated by the Arizona Cardinals 26–20 the following week.

2016
Rollins entered training camp competing against Damarious Randall and LaDarius Gunter for the vacant starting cornerback left by the departure of Casey Hayward in free agency. He was named the third cornerback and the starting nickelback to start the  regular season.

Rollins started the Green Bay Packers' season-opener at the Jacksonville Jaguars and made two combined tackles and two pass deflections during a 27-23 victory. He suffered a groin injury and missed three games (Weeks 6-8). On December 11, 2016, he recorded seven combined tackles, two pass break ups, and intercepted a pass by Russell Wilson during a 38-10 win against the Seattle Seahawks. The following week, Rollins collected a career-high eight solo tackles in a 30-27 victory at the Chicago Bears. He finished the 2016 season with 41 combined tackles (39 solo), eight pass deflections, and an interceptions in 13 games and ten starts.

2017
Rollins entered camp competing with rookie Kevin King for the third cornerback spot on the Packers' depth chart. He was named the third cornerback behind Davon House and Damarious Randall.

He played in the Green Bay Packers' season-opener against the Seattle Seahawks and made a season-high eight combined tackles and a pass deflection in their 17-9 victory. In Week 3, he saw a sharp decline in his snap count after he was surpassed by King on the depth chart and safety Morgan Burnett was given nickelback duties. On October 16, 2017, Rollins was placed on injured reserve after suffering a non-contact leg injury in Week 6. He finished the 2017 season with 19 combined tackles (nine solo) and two pass deflections in six games and one start. He received an overall grade of 41.3 from Pro Football Focus in 2017.

2018
The Packers attempted to convert Rollins to safety during the 2018 preseason, as well as giving him punt return duties, but he struggled in both roles. Rollins sustained a hamstring injury during the final preseason game against the Kansas City Chiefs on August 30; two days later, on September 1, the Packers placed Rollins on injured reserve. He was later released by the Packers with an injury settlement.

Arizona Cardinals
On November 27, 2018, Rollins signed with the Arizona Cardinals. He was released on December 18, 2018.

San Francisco 49ers
On August 16, 2019, Rollins was signed by the San Francisco 49ers. He was released during final roster cuts on August 30, 2019.

NFL career statistics

Personal life
Rollins has a daughter, Quinlyn, who was born in 2011.

References

External links
Green Bay Packers bio
Miami RedHawks bio

1992 births
Living people
People from Wilmington, Ohio
Players of American football from Canton, Ohio
Basketball players from Canton, Ohio
Guards (basketball)
American football cornerbacks
Miami RedHawks football players
Miami RedHawks men's basketball players
Green Bay Packers players
Arizona Cardinals players
San Francisco 49ers players
American men's basketball players